Sankt Johann is part of the city of Saarbrücken in Saarland, Germany.

Sankt Johann got its name from a chapel erected there. From 1321 to 1859 it formed a single town with Saarbrücken, and then was united to form one municipality with Saarbrücken and Malstatt-Burbach. It joined with the former Saarbrücken, Burbach-Malstatt, and Sankt Arnual to form the present-day city of Saarbrücken in 1909.

References

Saarbrücken